Paraxenisaurus (meaning "strange lizard") is a genus of deinocheirid theropod dinosaur that lived in what is now Mexico during the Campanian stage of the Late Cretaceous Period, 73 to 72.1 million years ago.

Discovery and naming 
During the 1990s, ornithomimosaur fossils were discovered at three sites in the Cerro del Pueblo Formation of Coahuila state. Two decades later, these remains were identified as belonging to a distinct North American taxon. In 2020, they were named and described by Mexican paleontologists Claudia Inés Serrano-Brañas, Belinda Espinosa-Chávez, Sarah Augusta Maccracken, Cirene Gutiérrez-Blando, Claudio de León-Dávila and José Flores Ventura. The type species Paraxenisaurus normalensis. The generic name is derived from the Greek paráxenos, "strange". The specific name is after the Benemérita Escuela Normal de Coahuila, a teacher training institution, where the fossils had been deposited. They include the holotype  BENC 2/2-001, a partial skeleton lacking the skull. Four additional specimens were referred, from separate individuals. The material contains vertebrae of the backbone, as well as a thighbone, an astragalus and hand, most notably a manual claw, and foot elements.

Description 

Based on the fossil elements of the holotype, the specimen was an adult.

Classification 
A phylogenetic analysis recovered Paraxenisaurus as a member of the Deinocheiridae, in a polytomy with Deinocheirus and Garudimimus. It would then represent the first deinocheirid dinosaur found in North America.

Paleoecology 
Known from the Cerro del Pueblo Formation, Paraxenisaurus lived alongside Coahuilaceratops, Latirhinus, and Velafrons, and other undescribed ornithomimosaurs. This area was most likely a coastal plain during the Late Cretaceous.

References

Late Cretaceous dinosaurs of North America
Fossil taxa described in 2020
Ornithomimosaurs
Campanian life
Fossils of Mexico